David Cobeño Iglesias (born 6 April 1982) is a Spanish football executive who is the director of football of La Liga club Rayo Vallecano and a former professional footballer who played as a goalkeeper.

Playing career
Born in Madrid, Cobeño graduated from the youth academy of local Rayo Vallecano. After one season with lowly SD Ponferradina he was bought by Real Madrid, spending the 2005–06 campaign in Segunda División with its B team.

After good performances, Cobeño moved to Sevilla FC. Initially backing up Andrés Palop, he benefited from an injury to the first-choice during a March 2007 home win over RC Celta de Vigo and went on to make four full additional appearances, adding three in the Andalusians' victorious run in the UEFA Cup.

In 2007–08, Cobeño was loaned to neighbouring – and La Liga newcomers – UD Almería. After starting the season as the starting goalkeeper, he lost the job to Brazilian Diego Alves, only reappearing for two of the side's last three games; subsequently, he was released by Sevilla and returned to Rayo on a three-year deal, as the Madrid club promoted again to the second level.

On 24 May 2009, Cobeño scored from his own goal, opening the score in an eventual 1–2 home loss against Elche CF. During his first season in his second spell he was the team's undisputed starter as they eventually retained their league status, and won the Ricardo Zamora Trophy for the campaign (38 goals conceded).

In 2010–11, Cobeño continued as Rayo's first choice, only missing four league matches in 42 and helping the club return to the top division after eight years. In the summer of 2012, after not renewing his contract, he moved abroad and signed for FC Vaslui in Romania, but returned to Campo de Fútbol de Vallecas after only two months having failed to adjust.

Post-retirement
On 1 June 2016, aged 34, Cobeño retired and was immediately appointed as Rayo's director of football.

Honours

Club
Sevilla
Copa del Rey: 2006–07
UEFA Cup: 2006–07

Individual
Ricardo Zamora Trophy (Segunda División): 2008–09

References

External links

1982 births
Living people
Footballers from Madrid
Spanish footballers
Association football goalkeepers
La Liga players
Segunda División players
Segunda División B players
Tercera División players
Rayo Vallecano B players
SD Ponferradina players
Real Madrid C footballers
Real Madrid Castilla footballers
Sevilla FC players
UEFA Cup winning players
UD Almería players
Rayo Vallecano players